Manuel Lopes Rodrigues (December 31, 1860 — October 22, 1917) was a Brazilian Realist painter. Born in the city of Salvador, in the State of Bahia, he was initially homeschooled by his father, João Francisco Lopes Rodrigues, later entering at the Liceu de Artes e Ofícios, being taught by Miguel Navarro Cañizares.

Later, he became a teacher for the Liceu, where he taught Prisciliano Silva and Alberto Valença.

Gallery 
Some works by Lopes Rodrigues:

External links

1860 births
1917 deaths
People from Salvador, Bahia
Realist painters
19th-century Brazilian painters
19th-century Brazilian male artists
20th-century Brazilian painters
20th-century Brazilian male artists